Butterworth Outer Ring Road (BORR)  (Malay: Lebuhraya Lingkaran Luar Butterworth) is a coastal expressway located in Butterworth, Penang, Malaysia. This  expressway connects Sungai Dua in the north until Perai in the south.

Route background
The zeroeth kilometre of the expressway is located at Sungai Dua Interchange. Ships can be seen near Bagan Ajam Rest Area. The Penang Megamall is located at the end of the highway. It is a six-lane line and it is also the connecting highway to Federal Route 1, from which north bound traffic will bring travelers to Alor Setar and beyond while motorists travelling south can head to Ipoh and beyond.

History
Construction began in 2003 and work was completed in 2006. The expressway was open to motorists in January 2007. As Sungai Nyior residents protested against high toll rate in February 2007, the Sungai Nyior toll booth collection was postponed by the Ministry of Works.

This highway is built to reduce the heavy traffic on the Sungai Dua–Juru NSE in the rushing hours and the holiday seasons. Nowadays, it is also used by residents in the Raja Uda area to head to Perai and the Megamall Pinang.

The people of Raja Uda area can also travel on the highway to head to the Sunway Carnival Mall.

With just one toll payment, this highway will bring motorists from both the south and the north to the ferry terminal for onward faster and cheaper ferry-crossing to Penang since the Penang Bridge faces heavy traffic congestion.

Features
Notable features of the expressway include Sungai Prai Bridge over the Perai River and Sungai Maklom Bridge over the Maklom River.

Tolls
The Butterworth Outer Ring Road uses open toll systems.

Electronic Toll Collections (ETC)
As part of an initiative to facilitate faster transactions at the Perai, Bagan Ajam  and Sungai Nyior Toll Plazas, all toll transactions at the two toll plazas are conducted electronically using Touch 'n Go cards or SmartTAGs since 1 June 2016.

Toll rates
(Since 15 October 2015)

Perai toll plaza

Bagan Ajam toll plaza

Sungai Nyior toll plaza

List of interchanges

Main Route

NBCT-Sungai Nyior Link

References

External links
 Lingkaran Luar Butterworth Sdn Bhd (LLB)
 The Butterworth Outer Ring Road (BORR)

Expressways in Malaysia
Expressways and highways in Penang
Northern Corridor Economic Region
Ring roads in Malaysia
Roads in Penang
Seberang Perai